Nové Lublice is a municipality and village in Opava District in the Moravian-Silesian Region of the Czech Republic. It has about 200 inhabitants.

History
The first written mention of Nové Lublice is from 1588.

Notable people
Alois Anderka (1825–1886), politician, mayor of Ostrava

Gallery

References

External links

Villages in Opava District